Hinduism is the 3rd largest religion in Saudi Arabia, followed by nearly 1.3% of total population residing in the nation. As of 2020, there were nearly 451,347 Hindus residing in Saudi Arabia, among whom most of them were from Indians and Nepalis. There has been a large migration of Indians to Saudi Arabia, with the number of Hindus also witnessing a growth.

Background 
Saudi Arabia is an Islamic theocracy. Sunni Islam is the official and state religion of the state and practice of any religion, other than Islam publicly is not allowed. Only Muslims are allowed to acquire Saudi Arabian nationality and all of the Hindus living in the nation are foreigner based expatriates and tourists on working and tourist permits.

Though in the recent years, many Indians have migrated to Saudi Arabia for employment, earlier most of them were Muslim, but after 2001 there has been an increase in population of other religions, mainly Hindus and was also accompanied by the Nepali diaspora to Saudi Arabia, out of whom the majority were Hindus which has Hinduism lead as the fastest growing religion in Saudi Arabia. Though having an adequate population of Hindus, there is no Hindu temple or any other place of worship for non-Muslims and the freedom of religion of non-Muslims is very much limited.

Persecution
Like other non-Muslim religions, Hindus are not permitted to worship publicly in Saudi Arabia. There have also been some complaints of destruction of Hindu religious items by Saudi Arabian authorities. Saudi authorities interpret Hindu icons as idols, and idol worship is strongly condemned in Islam. This is likely the foundation for the stringent position of Saudi authorities when it comes to idol worshiper religious practice. Muslims are not allowed to leave Islam as it is punishable by death as apostasy. Proselytizing by non-Muslims, including the distribution of non-Muslim religious materials such as Bibles, Bhagavad Gita, and Ahmedi Books are illegal.

On 24 March 2005, Saudi authorities destroyed religious items found in a raid on a makeshift Hindu shrine found in an apartment in Riyadh.

Demographics

See also 

 Religion in Saudi Arabia
 Hinduism in Arab states

References

Religion in Saudi Arabia
Hinduism in the Middle East
Hinduism in the Arab world
Hinduism in Asia
Ethnic groups in Saudi Arabia
Saudi Arabia